Peter Christopher Dowd (born 20 June 1957) is a British Labour Party politician. He was elected as the Member of Parliament (MP) for Bootle in May 2015. From 2017 to 2020, he served as the Shadow Chief Secretary to the Treasury.

Early life
Dowd was born and raised in Bootle in a large working-class family with a long history of activism in the Labour Party. His great-uncles, Simon and Peter Mahon, served as Labour MPs. Educated at local primary and secondary schools and college, he gained undergraduate and postgraduate degrees from Liverpool and Lancaster Universities, as well as other postgraduate qualifications.

Political career
Dowd was a Merseyside County Councillor from 1981 to 1986 for Bootle number 1 ward (Hawthorne), which is around the Hawthorne road area of Bootle and Derby park area. He became a Sefton Borough councillor in 1991 when he replaced Joe Benton for the Derby ward.

He was a councillor for Derby from 1991 to 2003, before he moved to St Oswalds ward (covering Netherton and Marion Square). He was also chair of Merseyside Fire Authority in the 1990s. Dowd was elected Sefton Labour group leader after the death of Dave Martin, and was leader until 2015. He was consequently elected Leader of Sefton Council from 2011 to 2015.

In 2015, he was elected to the House of Commons as the Member of Parliament for Bootle, which forms part of the Metropolitan Borough of Sefton where Dowd was in local government. Bootle has traditionally been one of the safest Labour seats in the UK; Dowd succeeded Benton as the seat's MP.

Dowd was one of 48 Labour MPs to vote against the second reading of the Conservative government's Welfare Reform and Work Bill, which included £12bn in welfare cuts, on 20 July 2015. In doing so they defied the party's leadership, which had ordered MPs to abstain.

In February 2017, Jeremy Corbyn, the leader of the Labour Party, appointed him to the position of Shadow Chief Secretary to the Treasury.

Personal life
On 6 October 2020, Dowd's daughter, Jennie, died at the age of 31 following a cycling collision. The driver was sentenced to 12 months in prison.

References

External links

1957 births
Living people
Alumni of Lancaster University
Alumni of the University of Liverpool
Councillors in Merseyside
Labour Party (UK) councillors
Labour Party (UK) MPs for English constituencies
People from Bootle
UK MPs 2015–2017
UK MPs 2017–2019
UK MPs 2019–present
Leaders of local authorities of England